Flávio Barros may refer to:

 Flávio Barros (footballer, born 1966), Brazilian football manager and former centre-back
 Flávio Barros (footballer, born 1978), Brazilian football striker